WASP-60 is a F-type main-sequence star about 1420 light-years away. The stars age is much younger than the Sun's at  1.7 billion years. WASP-60 is enriched in heavy elements, having 180% of the solar abundance of iron. The star does not have noticeable starspot activity, an unexpected observation for a relatively young star. The age of WASP-60 determined by different methods is highly discrepant though, and it may actually be an old star which experienced an episode of spin-up in the past.

The star was named Morava in 2019 by Serbian amateur astronomers as part of the NameExoWorlds contest.

A multiplicity survey in 2015 did not detect any stellar companions to WASP-60.

Planetary system
In 2012 a transiting hot Jupiter planet b was detected on a tight, circular orbit. The planet was named Vlasina by Serbian astronomers in December 2019.

Measurement of the Rossiter–McLaughlin effect in 2018 revealed WASP-60b is on a retrograde orbit relative to the equatorial plane of the star, orbital obliquity equal to 129°.

References

Pegasus (constellation)
G-type main-sequence stars
Planetary systems with one confirmed planet
Planetary transit variables
J23463997+3109213
Morava